Marek Matuszewski (born 14 August 1959 in Zgierz) is a Polish politician. He was elected to the Sejm on 25 September 2005, with 4806 votes in 11 Sieradz district, as a candidate from the  Law and Justice list.

See also
Members of Polish Sejm 2005-2007

References

External links
Marek Matuszewski - parliamentary page - includes declarations of interest, voting record, and transcripts of speeches.

1959 births
Living people
People from Zgierz
Law and Justice politicians
Members of the Polish Sejm 2005–2007
Members of the Polish Sejm 2007–2011
Members of the Polish Sejm 2011–2015
Members of the Polish Sejm 2015–2019
Members of the Polish Sejm 2019–2023
Solidarity Electoral Action politicians